Chen Rijin (born 17 January 1999) is a Chinese footballer currently playing as a defender for Guangzhou.

Career statistics

Club
.

References

1999 births
Living people
Chinese footballers
Association football defenders
Guangzhou F.C. players
Chinese Super League players